Wrong Way Up is a 1990 album by Brian Eno and John Cale.

The album sits between the electronic, prog-rock and art rock genres and features some of both Eno and Cale's most mainstream work. The cover was conceived by Eno. The 2005 re-release on All Saints Records was remastered and had a different cover, but reverted to the original in 2020. It contains two bonus tracks, "Grandfather's House" and ″You Don't Miss Your Water″ by Eno. Both titles only appeared on single or EP before; the latter was taken from the 1988 OST album Married to the Mob.

Reception 

Trouser Press praised the album, calling it "an absolutely wonderful pop record, a subversion of Top 40 formulae to the pair's own idiosyncratic (but utterly accessible) ends." In a retrospective review, Pitchfork called it "an album of contention, contrasts, cycles, and pop songs so layered and euphoric it ranks among the best albums either artist has ever made."

Track listing
All tracks written by John Cale and Brian Eno; except where indicated.

Original 1990 release
Side A
 "Lay My Love" – 4:44
 "One Word" – 4:34
 "In the Backroom" – 4:02
 "Empty Frame" – 4:26
 "Cordoba" – 4:22
Side B
 "Spinning Away" – 5:27
 "Footsteps" – 3:13
 "Been There, Done That" – 2:52
 "Crime in the Desert" – 3:42
 "The River" (Brian Eno) – 4:23

Bonus tracks on 2005 remaster

UK & rest of the world
 "Grandfather's House" (John Cale)
 "You Don't Miss Your Water" (William Bell)
US
 "You Don't Miss Your Water" (William Bell)
 "Palanquin" (John Cale)

Singles
"Been There, Done That" b/w ?, 1990 US ?
"Spinning Away" b/w "Grandfather's House", 1990 German 7"
"Spinning Away (edit)" b/w "Grandfather's House" / "Palanquin", 1990 German 12" & CD-single
"One Word" b/w "Grandfather's House" / "Palanquin", 1990 UK 12" & CD-single
"One Word" (edit) / "Empty Frame" / "You Don't Miss Your Water" / "One Word" (The Woodbridge Mix) / "Grandfather's House", 1991 US CD-EP

Promotional tracks
In the early 1990s, Warner Bros. US released a series of promotional-only 7" colored vinyl split-artist EPs called Soil Samples. Each side of these 7"ers would have unreleased tracks from the sessions of the artist's record these promos were ostensibly promoting.

Soil Samples #3 had unreleased tracks by House of Freaks on one side, and two unreleased cuts from the Eno/Cale Wrong Way Up sessions on the other side: a cover of "Ring of Fire" with vocals by Eno, and the instrumental "Shuffle Down to Woodbridge", apparently Cale solo.

To date, neither of these has been issued on CD, or anywhere else except this promotional 7".

Personnel

John Cale – lead vocals (2, 3, 5, 7, 8, 9), backing vocals, pianos, keyboards, bass, harp, horn, dumbek, viola, strings, omnichord
Brian Eno – lead vocals (1, 2, 4, 6, 9, 10), backing vocals, keyboards, rhythm bed, Indian drum, guitars, Shinto bell, bass, little Nigerian organ, cover picture
Robert Ahwai – rhythm guitar
Nell Catchpole – violins
Rhett Davies – backing vocals
Daryl Johnson – bass
Ronald Jones – tabla, drums
Bruce Lampcov – backing vocals
Dave Young – guitars, bass
Technical
Recordings engineered by Brian Eno, except John Cale's vocals recordings, which were engineered by Dave Young
Rhett Davies, Bruce Lampcov, Brian Eno – mixing
Brian Eno, Kevin Cann – art, design

References

Brian Eno albums
John Cale albums
1990 albums
Albums produced by John Cale
Albums produced by Brian Eno
Collaborative albums
All Saints Records albums